Centric Software is a Silicon Valleybased software company headquartered in Campbell, California. The company designs software, in particular Product Lifecycle Management (PLM) systems, for fashion, retail, footwear, outdoor, luxury, home décor and consumer goods industries, including formulated products (Food & Beverage and Cosmetic & Personal Care)

History
Centric Software was founded in 1998. The company began as a PLM vendor and then made developments in enterprise mobility applications suite with visual, touch-screen based digital board solutions.

The company has provided PLM solutions to retailers and manufacturers including Volcom, Tesco, Louis Vuitton, SIPLEC, Balenciaga, and Calvin Klein among others.

Centric's PLM was also purchased by LIME, a Russian fashion company as part of the company's efforts to its products outside of USA. As of January 2020, the company has 15 offices around the world and 4 virtual centres. Its investors include Dassault Systèmes, Oak Investment Partners, Masthead Venture Partners, and Fung Capital USA.

Products
Centric Software has integrated 3D, mobility, AI, cloud, SaaS, and Agile Development to develop their products.

See also
 Dassault Systèmes
 Product life-cycle management (marketing)

References

1998 establishments in California
Companies based in Silicon Valley
Companies based in Campbell, California
Software companies based in California
Software companies established in 1998
American companies established in 1998